Dr. John Glenn House is a historic home located near Jenkinsville, Fairfield County, South Carolina.  It was built about 1845, and is a two-story, five bay, weatherboarded frame, end-gabled Greek Revival style residence.  It has a double-pile and central-hall plan with a rear shed room. The front façade features a two-tiered porch in the three central bays with a pedimented gable end.

It was added to the National Register of Historic Places in 1984.

References

Houses on the National Register of Historic Places in South Carolina
Greek Revival houses in South Carolina
Houses completed in 1845
Houses in Fairfield County, South Carolina
National Register of Historic Places in Fairfield County, South Carolina